The 2008 end of year rugby tests, also known as the Autumn internationals saw Australia, New Zealand, South Africa, Argentina, the Pacific Islanders and Canada tour the northern hemisphere. The tour ended with the traditional 'final challenge' Barbarians match, against Australia, which was the first rugby union Test at the new Wembley Stadium. New Zealand and Australia also contested a Bledisloe Cup match outside of either country for the first time; the match was played in Hong Kong with the hope of raising rugby's profile in China.

The test matches took on added significance, with seedings for the 2011 Rugby World Cup draw to take place on 1 December at stake. For the first time in the history of the Rugby World Cup, the International Rugby Board used the IRB World Rankings to seed teams in the World Cup draw. Teams will be assigned to four-strong seeding pots based on their rankings; each team within a pot will be drawn into a different pool for the World Cup finals.

New Zealand recorded a second straight grand slam tour.

Overview

Week 1

Week 2

 Kaplan, who went into the match sharing the record for most Tests as referee (46) with Paul Honiss of New Zealand, took sole possession of the record. He replaced the injured Steve Walsh as referee for this match.

Week 3

Week 4
Going into Week 4, the main storyline was the battle for fourth place in the IRB World Rankings. New Zealand, South Africa, and Australia were entrenched in the top three. The team that stood in fourth place on 1 December would avoid being drawn into the same pool as one of the Tri Nations powers in 2011. Four teams could have ended the week in fourth place: Argentina, England, France, and Wales.

 The Pacific Islanders defeated a Test team for the first time in nine attempts.

The missed conversion by Ronan O'Gara on Ireland's only try of the match proved decisive for Argentina. With the other results on the day, the Pumas would have dropped to fifth place, behind England, if O'Gara had converted, as it would have given Ireland a win by more than 15 points. As it turned out, Argentina retained fourth by a narrow margin.

Week 5
The battle for fourth place in the IRB World Rankings finished this weekend, with Argentina remaining in fourth place without playing as England lost and Wales failed to achieve the 15-point winning margin required. Argentina therefore took top seeding for the following month's 2011 Rugby World Cup draw along with the three Tri-Nations teams.

The other major news of the week was New Zealand's win over England, completing a successful Grand Slam tour for the All Blacks. This was the All Blacks' third such successful tour, with the previous ones being in 1978 and 2005.

Effect on World Cup seeding
Following the 29 November tests, the 12 teams that qualified automatically for the 2011 Rugby World Cup were seeded thus:

Pot 1

Pot 2

Pot 3

Notes and references

2008
2008–09 in European rugby union
2008 in Oceanian rugby union
2008 in North American rugby union
2008 in South American rugby union
2008 in South African rugby union